Seweryn Berson (1858–1917) was a Polish lawyer and composer. Born in Nowy Sącz, early in his youth he moved to Lwów (then in Galicia, currently in Ukraine), where he spent most of his life. A student of Berlin-based conservatory of Heinrich Urban, he composed numerous operettas ( – Dance lesson; 1902), serenades, romances and bagatelles, as well as numerous songs to the lyrics by Heinrich Heine, Henrik Ibsen and Maria Konopnicka. He died March 4, 1917, in Lwów and was buried there.

References

External links
 Scores by Seweryn Berson in digital library Polona

Polish composers
1858 births
1917 deaths